is a history museum located in Seiyo, Ehime, Japan. The museum introduces mainly the history and folklore of Ehime prefecture in general, and the southern region of it in specific.

History  
The museum was opened to the public in November 1994.  At the time it was located in Uwa town, which was merged with neighbor towns and districts to form the new city of Seiyo.

Facilities 
The museum includes four historical exhibitions, a folklore exhibition, experience study room, a library, and a hall where seminars about cultural history are held.

Access  
The museum is located approximately 20 minutes walk from Unomachi Station on the Yosan Line.

See also 
 Kaimei School

References

External links  
 Museum of Ehime History and Culture 

History museums in Japan
Museums in Ehime Prefecture
Museums established in 1994
1994 establishments in Japan
Seiyo, Ehime